Omar Tiberiades or Abû Hafs 'Umar ibn Farrukhân Tabarî (d. ca. 815), (Persian ابن فرخان طبری) was a Medieval Persian astrologer and architect from Tabaristan.

The historical Tabaristan region is in the present-day Mazandaran Province of northern Iran.

Works
Around the year 800, Tiberiades translated the Middle Persian version of the Pentateuch by Dorotheus of Sidon. He translated the five books into the Arabic language.

A Latin translation of his book was often quoted by Western astrologers.

See also

References

External links

Iranian architects
Medieval architects
Year of birth unknown
815 deaths
Medieval Iranian astrologers
History of Mazandaran Province
Tabaristan
People from Amol
9th-century Iranian people
9th-century astrologers
9th-century translators
Middle Persian–Arabic translators